The Jáchal River is a river in the province of San Juan, Argentina. It is born from the confluence of the Río de la Palca and the Blanco River, in the northwest of San Juan.

Course 
There, it turns eastward towards the city of San José de Jáchal, flowing for  along a steep gorge. It then flows  and empties into the upper Desaguadero River (here known as Bermejo).

The Jáchal River is fed primarily by snow thaw, rainfall being only a minor contribution in this semi-arid region.

The river is dammed in two points:
It is used to regulate and direct the flow for irrigation, and long-delayed works are in progress to finish a hydroelectric power station.

Environmental issues
The Jáchal is the most important natural source of water for domestic, agricultural and industrial use in its valley, but the quality of its waters is not considered good in normal conditions, due to a high mineralization, especially salts and boron content. The latter has been found in concentrations of 2.8 parts per million (0.7 ppm are considered the upper limit for sensitive crops such as grapes).

In the early 2000s, Barrick Gold Corporation, a Canadian enterprise and the largest gold-mining corporation in the world, started a gold extraction project in the San Juan Andean ranges. Residents of San Juan protested against the project, claiming that the cyanide process will pollute the upper courses of the Jáchal and San Juan rivers. In an interview in February 2006, the governor of San Juan, José Luis Gioja, denied the possibility of such damage.

In 2015, Barrick Gold Corporation admitted that 224,000 liters of "cyanide solution" had spilled into the Jáchal and four other nearby rivers due to what they described as "a faulty valve". While Barrick Gold Corporation and the San Juan Mining Chamber insisted that the spill posed "no threat" to the area's population, the provincial government advised that residents only drink bottled water until further notice.

References

External links
 CUENCAS HIDRICAS SUPERFICIALES DE LA REPUBLICA ARGENTINA.
 Secretaría de Minería de la Nación. Provincia de San Juan - Recursos hídricos.
 INTA. Conferencia Internacional sobre Boro en la EEA San Juan.
 Fundación para la defensa del ambiente (FUNAM). Chile: crudo e inédito debate parlamentario sobre minera Barrick y proyecto Pascua Lama.
 CuyoNoticias. Manifestación en contra empresa minera internacional.

Rivers of Argentina
Rivers of San Juan Province, Argentina